Mark Foster is a retired American soccer player who played professionally in the USL A-League.

In 1997, Foster signed with the Nashville Metros of the USL A-League. After spending the 1998 and 1999 seasons with the Orange County Zodiac, he did not play again until 2005 when he saw time in one game with the Bakersfield Brigade of the USL Premier Development League.

References

Living people
1973 births
American soccer players
Bakersfield Brigade players
Nashville Metros players
Orange County Blue Star players
A-League (1995–2004) players
USL League Two players
Association football defenders
Association football midfielders